Phyllis Barry (born Gertrude Phyllis Hillyard; 7 December 1908 – 1 July 1954) was an English film actress. Born in Leeds, West Riding of Yorkshire, England, to Seth Henry and Bertha (née Giles) Hillyard, Barry appeared in over 40 films between 1925  and 1947.

Career
Barry trained as a dancer in a John Tiller troupe. In August 1923, when she was 12, her mother brought her to Australia, where she was known as Phyllis du Barry. By September, she was the lead dancer in a cabaret troupe at the Wentworth Cafe, until May 1925, when she made her first film, Painted Daughters. Engagements followed with the Frances Scully Pony Ballet and as a dancer at the Ambassadors' Club. In July 1926, she joined the Fuller Brothers, touring with Chefalo and Palmer, the Moon and Morris Revue Company and the Zig Zag Revue Company. Her second film, Sunrise, was made in 1926. In 1927, she appeared as a specialty dancer in the musicals No, No, Nanette and Gershwin's Lady Be Good, both starring Elsie Prince. She then joined the Jim Gerald Revue Company.

Her mother was an accomplished dress designer, both for the Empire Theatre in Sydney and on her own account, under the name "Madame du Barry." In February 1928, her mother married Jim Gerald's brother, Lance Vane. In March, Phyllis accompanied her newly acquired uncle and aunt, Jim Gerald and Essie Jennings, on an extensive tour of America, returning in November. On her return, Phyllis remained with Jim Gerald's company, then other Fullers' companies, until April 1929, when she joined the cast of Rio Rita, starring Gladys Moncrieff, as a dancer. 

In March 1930, Phyllis went to America and, under the name of Phyllis du Barry, toured the coast with the Fanchon and Marco Company. After arriving in Hollywood, she was given a film part when director King Vidor selected Barry to co-star as "the other woman" in the 1932 Samuel Goldwyn film Cynara opposite Ronald Coleman and Kay Francis. In 1933, she starred alongside Buster Keaton and Jimmy Durante in the comedy What! No Beer? for MGM. Her career did not include other major productions.

Modern viewers will remember Barry for her role as a foreign spy who seduces Curly Howard in the Three Stooges short subject Three Little Sew and Sews. Other films include The Prince and the Pauper, One Rainy Afternoon, Blind Adventure, and Laurel and Hardy's Bonnie Scotland.

Barry married the vaudevillian Abner Nordlund in March 1932, divorcing him in April 1934, then shortly after married the painter/decorator Gilbert M. Caldwell, living in West Hollywood. Her mother had joined her in America in July 1930, and lived with the couple.

Death
Barry died of barbiturate poisoning caused by the ingestion of phenobarbital on 1 July 1954.

Filmography

 Painted Daughters (1925) as Saharab 
 Sunrise (1926) as Hope Stuart
 Cynara (1932) as Doris Emily Lea
 Blind Adventure (1933) as Gwen
 Diplomaniacs (1933) as Fifi
 Goodbye Love (1933) as Dorothy Blaine
 Marriage on Approval (1933) as Dorothy
 What! No Beer? (1933) as Hortense
 Long Lost Father (1934) as Party guest
 Hips, Hips, Hooray! (1934) as Madame Irene
 Where Sinners Meet (1934) as Brunette Chambermaid
 Love Past Thirty (1934) as Beth Ramsden
 The Moonstone (1934) as Anne Verinder
 Forbidden Heaven (1935) as Sybil Radford
 Bonnie Scotland (1935) as Gossip
 One Rainy Afternoon (1936) as Felice
 To Mary with Love (1937) as Guest
 Step Lively, Jeeves! (1937) as Mrs. Tremaine
 The Prince and the Pauper (1937) as Barmaid
 Damaged Goods (1937) as Margie
 Affairs of Cappy Ricks (1937) as Ellen Ricks Peasely
 Bulldog Drummond Comes Back (1937) as  Hortense, barmaid
 The Invisible Menace (1938) as Mrs. Aline Dolman
 Trade Winds (1938) as Ruth
 Three Little Sew and Sews (1939, Short) as Miss Olga Arvin
 The Jones Family in Hollywood (1939) as Actress 
 The Witness Vanishes (1939) as Miss Carson
 Kid Nightingale (1939) as First Girl with Mrs. Reynolds 
 We Are Not Alone (1939) as First Chorus Girl
 Secrets of a Model (1940) as Sally Adams
 I Was an Adventuress (1940) as Englishwoman at Exhibit
 Waterloo Bridge (1940) as Second Girl at Estate Dance 
 The Case of the Black Parrot (1941) as Julia
 Shadows on the Stairs (1941) as Lucy Timson, the Maid
 Gentleman from Dixie (1941) as Secretary
 Unfinished Business (1941) as Sheila
 The Mysterious Doctor (1943) as Ruby
 Frenchman's Creek (1944) as Woman in Gaming House
 Kitty (1945) as Guest 
 Love from a Stranger (1947) as Waitress

References

External links

1908 births
1954 deaths
English film actresses
British actresses
Actresses from London
20th-century English actresses
British emigrants to the United States
Barbiturates-related deaths
Drug-related deaths in California